Victoria Hislop (née Hamson; born 1959) is an English author.

Early life
Born in Bromley, Kent, she was raised in Tonbridge and attended Tonbridge Grammar School. She studied English at St Hilda's College, Oxford, and worked in publishing and as a journalist before becoming an author.

Career
Her novel The Island (2005) was a number-one bestseller in Britain, its success in part the result of having been selected by the Richard & Judy Book Club for their 2006 Summer Reads. To Nisi (The Island) was filmed as a TV series by the Greek TV channel MEGA.

In 2009, she donated the short story Aflame in Athens to Oxfam's "Ox-Tales" project, four collections of British stories written by 38 authors. Her story was published in the "Fire" collection. Hislop has a particular affection for Greece. She visits the country often for research and other reasons, and has a second home on the island of Crete.

Personal life 
Victoria married Private Eye editor Ian Hislop on 16 April 1988 in Oxford; the couple have two children, Emily Helen (born 1990) and William David (born 1993).

Hislop lived in London for over twenty years, but now lives in Sissinghurst.

In 2020, Hislop was granted honorary Greek citizenship for promoting modern Greek history and culture. The following year she was a contestant on Dancing with the Stars, the Greek version of Strictly Come Dancing.

Bibliography

Novels
The Island (2005)
The Return (2008)
The Thread (2011)
The Sunrise (2014)
Cartes Postales from Greece (2016)
Those Who Are Loved (2019)
One August Night (2020)
Maria's Island (2021)

Short stories
One Cretan Evening and Other Stories (2011)
 'One Cretan Evening' (2008)
 'The Pine Tree' (2008)
 'By The Fire' (2009)
 'The Warmest Christmas Ever' (2007)
 'Aflame in Athens' (2009)
 The Last Dance and Other Stories (2012; ten stories)

Non-fiction
Sink or Swim: The Self-help Book for Men Who Never Read Them (2002) (with Duncan Goodhew)
 Fix Your Life – Now!: The Six Step Plan to Help You Fix Your Life (2012) (with Duncan Goodhew)

References

External links
Official website

1959 births
Living people
Alumni of St Hilda's College, Oxford
English writers
People educated at Tonbridge Grammar School
People from Bromley
People from Sissinghurst
English women novelists
English short story writers
British women short story writers